Maxwell (formerly, Occident) is a census-designated place and farm community in Colusa County, California. It lies at an elevation of 92 feet (28 m). Located off Interstate 5, it is home to Maxwell High School. The main crop grown is rice, though a variety of others such as grapes, almonds, olives, squash, and sunflowers are grown as well. Its ZIP code is 95955 and its area code is 530. Maxwell's population was 1,103 at the 2010 census.

History
The community bears the name of its founder. Swifts Stone Corral is listed as a California Historical Landmark No. 238. The original owner and builder of this stone corral was Granville P. Swift, a native of Kentucky. In 1847 Swift began ranching in Stone Creek Valley in Colusa County. In 1850 he and his partner Frank Sears needed a corral and, as there was no timber in the surrounding country, they built one from the flat stones that were scattered over the area.

Demographics
The 2010 United States Census reported that Maxwell had a population of 1,103. The racial makeup of Maxwell was 734 (43.9%) White, 11 (0.7%) African American, 14 (0.8%) Native American, 9 (0.5%) Asian, 2 (0.1%) Pacific Islander, 306 (18.3%) from other races, and 27 (1.6%) from two or more races. Hispanic or Latino of any race were 570 persons (34.1%).

The Census reported that 1,103 people (100% of the population) lived in households, 0 (0%) lived in non-institutionalized group quarters, and 0 (0%) were institutionalized.

There were 365 households, out of which 156 (42.7%) had children under the age of 18 living in them, 208 (57.0%) were opposite-sex married couples living together, 43 (11.8%) had a female householder with no husband present, 24 (6.6%) had a male householder with no wife present.  There were 12 (3.3%) unmarried opposite-sex partnerships, and 5 (1.4%) same-sex married couples or partnerships. 79 households (21.6%) were made up of individuals, and 38 (10.4%) had someone living alone who was 65 years of age or older. The average household size was 3.02.  There were 275 families (75.3% of all households); the average family size was 3.56.

The population was spread out, with 356 people (32.3%) under the age of 18, 89 people (8.1%) aged 18 to 24, 265 people (24.0%) aged 25 to 44, 242 people (21.9%) aged 45 to 64, and 151 people (13.7%) who were 65 years of age or older.  The median age was 33.9 years. For every 100 females, there were 108.9 males.  For every 100 females age 18 and over, there were 101.9 males.

The homeowner vacancy rate was 0.4%; the rental vacancy rate was 1.5%.  695 people (63.0% of the population) lived in owner-occupied housing units and 408 people (37.0%) lived in rental housing units.

Politics

References

Census-designated places in Colusa County, California
Census-designated places in California